Kristi Terzian (born April 22, 1967 in Sanger, California) is a retired American alpine skier.

References

External links

1967 births
Living people
American female alpine skiers
People from Sanger, California
21st-century American women
Sportspeople from Fresno County, California